Mobile International Airport  is a public use airport located three nautical miles (6 km) south of the central business district of Mobile, a city in Mobile County, Alabama, United States.  The airport is a principal component of the Mobile Aeroplex at Brookley, a  industrial complex. It is owned and operated by the Mobile Airport Authority.  Prior to 1969, the airport was part of an active military installation known as Brookley Air Force Base.

According to the FAA's National Plan of Integrated Airport Systems for 2009–2013, it is categorized as a general aviation facility. This was a change from the 2007–2011 NPIAS Report, when it was categorized as a reliever airport.

Facilities
The airport has a control tower and has both a  runway and a  runway. Various instrument approaches to all runways are available, including an on-site VORTAC and instrument landing system (ILS). The complex is served by a 24-hour fixed-base operator, Signature Flight Services.

Starting in late 2018, the Mobile Airport Authority began renovating an underutilized building partially occupied by Airbus into a low cost carrier passenger airport facility called Terminal 1. Since its opening on May 1, 2019, Terminal 1 has housed two boarding gates and five ticket counters. Frontier Airlines Flight 410 from Chicago's O'Hare International Airport was the first scheduled revenue flight, arriving at the facility on May 1. In the summer of 2019, the authority plans to take over the remaining space in the building to completely build out Terminal 1. After this build-out, Terminal 1 will have four gates and additional holding and concession space. The total square footage will be around 50,000 square feet.

Terminal 1 is located at the southern terminus of Michigan Avenue in the Brookley complex, less than a mile south of Interstate 10.

Operations
For the 12-month period ending January 31, 2010, the airport had 82,820 aircraft operations, an average of 226 per day: 49% general aviation, 43% military, 5% air taxi, and 3% scheduled commercial. At that time there were 34 aircraft based at this airport: 65% single-engine, 18% multi-engine, 15% jet and 3% helicopter.

Airlines and destinations
In 2018, the Mobile Airport Authority commissioned a study on whether to move passenger service to Mobile Downtown Airport from Mobile Regional Airport and announced ViaAir would start a route to Orlando in the spring. In January 2019, Frontier Airlines announced new service to Denver and Chicago beginning in May 2019. ViaAir announced they were ending most scheduled services network-wide, including at BFM, on May 23, 2019. On January 7, 2020, Frontier announced it would suspend all service to BFM, leaving the airport with no commercial passenger service. However, on April 13, 2020, Frontier announced it would stay at the Downtown Airport and commence service to Orlando. On June 4, 2020, it was announced that Frontier had ceased all operations at BFM.

In August 2020 it was announced that Mobile airport authority will shift commercial airline flights to the more convenient downtown airport.  Following two years of study, the Mobile Airport Authority has unveiled a master plan that calls for all commercial air service to move to the centrally-located Mobile Downtown (BFM) from Mobile Regional (MOB) airport in the next few years. A new airline terminal at the Downtown facility would feature eight gates and be located adjacent to Interstate 10 that runs through the city.

The move would make the airport more convenient to flyers, encouraging more airlines to add service thus lowering airfares, the airport authority says.

On March 7, 2023, Avelo Airlines announced twice weekly service to Orlando.

Passenger

Cargo

Destinations map

See also 
 List of airports in Alabama

References

External links
 Aviation photos: Mobile - Downtown (Brookley Field / CGAS) from Airliners.net
 Aerial image as of 4 March 2002 from USGS The National Map
 
 

Airports in Alabama
Buildings and structures in Mobile, Alabama
United States Coast Guard Air Stations
Transportation in Mobile, Alabama
Airports established in 1929
Transportation in Mobile County, Alabama
1929 establishments in Alabama